David Titterton (born 25 September 1971) is a former professional footballer who played in The Football League for Coventry City, Hereford United, Wycombe Wanderers.

References

English footballers
Coventry City F.C. players
Hereford United F.C. players
Wycombe Wanderers F.C. players
English Football League players
1971 births
Living people
Hednesford Town F.C. players
Association football defenders